Oren Root Jr. (May 18, 1838 – August 27, 1907) was an American Presbyterian minister and professor of mathematics and natural sciences at Hamilton College in Clinton, New York and professor of English at the University of Missouri. He was founder of the Zeta Phi Society as well as a member of the Sigma Phi fraternity and a high degree Freemason. He was the elder brother of Secretary of State Elihu Root.

Root was born in Syracuse, New York, to Oren Root I, a professor of mathematics at Hamilton College and was a brother of Elihu Root. He graduated from Hamilton in 1856 then attended Rutgers College for a Doctor of Divinity degree. In 1866 he became a professor of English at the University of Missouri-Columbia. He founded the Zeta Phi Society in 1870, now the Zeta Phi chapter of Beta Theta Pi. Root was also co-editor of the Columbian Speaker. He took up work at Hamilton College in 1880 where he taught natural sciences and mathematics for the last 27 years of his life. Root died in 1907 from cirrhosis of the liver at age 69. He was survived by his wife, two daughters, and three sons.

References

1838 births
1907 deaths
Hamilton College (New York) faculty
American people of English descent
University of Missouri faculty
American Presbyterian ministers
19th-century American clergy